Norman Denis Botton (born 21 January 1954) is a former English first-class cricketer.

Born at Hammersmith, Botton attended Hertford College, Oxford. While studying at Oxford, Botton played first-class cricket for Oxford University. His debut came against Leicestershire at Oxford in 1974. He played first-class cricket for Oxford until 1975, making fourteen appearances. In his fourteen matches, he scored a total of 272 runs at an average of 12.36 and with a high score of 38 not out. With his left-arm medium pace bowling, he took 11 wickets at a bowling average of 64.90, with best figures of 2 for 53. He also made a single first-class appearance for a combined Oxford and Cambridge Universities cricket team against the touring West Indians in 1974.

After graduating from Oxford, Botton became a schoolteacher. Prior to his retirement, he was the head of history at Monkton Combe School. Botton continued to play cricket long after the conclusion of his brief first-class career, featuring for the Somerset Over-50s and Over-60s. However, severe osteoarthritis which restricted his ability to walk made it impossible to play cricket. In 2013, Botton received a hip replacement and within ten months he was playing cricket once more, resulting in him being selected to play for the England Over-60s on their 2016 tour of Australia.

References

External links

1954 births
Living people
People from Hammersmith
Alumni of Hertford College, Oxford
English cricketers
Oxford University cricketers
Oxford and Cambridge Universities cricketers
Staff at Monkton Combe School
Schoolteachers from Somerset